Joyride is a 1997 American film directed by Quinton Peeples.

Plot summary
J.T., the bored slacker son of a motel owner, begins flirting with a visitor of the motel named Tanya, an aspiring model. James, J.T.'s best friend, gets drunk with J.T. and eventually steals the car of a motel visitor named Ms. Smith (played by Christine Naify<ref>The A.V. Club, Oct 5, 2001 - Joyride By Nathan Rabin</ref>) .  J.T., Tanya, and James drive around their dead-end town laughing and enjoying the night. They soon find a body in the trunk of the stolen car. J.T. and Tanya dump the body of the person in the lake. The body belonged to the town's doctor. It is revealed that Ms. Smith killed the doctor and is a professional assassin. They logically conclude that the car will not be reported stolen so J.T. decides to keep it. Later, two local bullies who harassed James and J.T. start destroying the car. Tanya gets the bully's baseball bat and they start kicking and beating them out of anger. The next day, the cops find the body and visit J.T.. Ms. Smith vouches and helps them evade suspicion from the detectives. She then threatens the lives of their families if her car isn't returned that night. Later, she kills a man who attempted to rape Tanya, and gets a photo of her at the crime scene, which could incriminate her. J.T. kisses Tanya in the car right before Ms. Smith arrives with James. She then tells Tanya to tie them both up and kill them. She whispers them both instructions to fake their deaths and it was successful. Ms. Smith takes Tanya and the car with her as she leaves. She later tells Tanya that she knew that they weren't dead and that it was a test for Tanya that she passed. They destroy the car in an explosion and Tanya becomes her apprentice.

Cast
 Tobey Maguire as J.T.
 Amy Hathaway as Tanya
 Wilson Cruz as James
 Christina Naify as Ms. Smith
 James Karen as The Client
 Adam West as Harold
 Benicio del Toro as Detective Lopez
 Steven Gilborn as Arthur
 J.P. Bumstead as Dr. Brewer
 Kenn Norman as Sheriff Cork
 Judson Mills as Redneck Joey
 Susan Romick  as Redneck Joey's Girlfriend
 Marc Robinson as Bobby
 Julie Donatt as Lisa
 Leslie Bartlett as Martina Hirsch
 Kristal Cawagas as Casey

ReceptionJoyride has received negative reviews from critics. It has a score of 20% on Rotten Tomatoes.

Soundtrack
On November 11, 1997, Warner Bros. Records released the Original Motion Picture Soundtrack for Joyride. The 17 tracks are:

 Light from a Dead Star (Instrumental) - Lush
 Chlorine Dream - Spirea X
 Game Of Broken Hearts - Tarnation
 Cherry Stars Collide - Swallow
 Unbearable Lightness of Bean - Baked Beans
 Human Bean - Baked Beans
 Something Borrowed - This Mortal Coil
 Cannon (Instrumental) - Scheer
 Subsonic Interferences - Oliver Lieb
 Shoot Out - Colourbox
 Breakdown - Michael Brook
 Ivy and Neet - This Mortal Coil
 A Thousand Stars Burst Open - Pale Saints
 Desire Lines - Lush
 Meniscus - This Mortal Coil
 No Motion - Dif Juz
 Home - His Name Is Alive

Reception
On Rotten Tomatoes it has a score of 20% based on reviews from 5 critics.

The A.V. Club called it "A depressingly mediocre little film"

Home media
On September 24, 2002, Artisan Entertainment released Joyride'' on DVD.

References

External links
 
 

1997 films
Artisan Entertainment films
American comedy-drama films
1990s English-language films
1990s American films